Sheffield Interchange is the main bus station in central Sheffield, South Yorkshire, England. The facility is served by buses operating across the Sheffield region, as well as National Express coaches that connect Sheffield with destinations across the United Kingdom. 

The Interchange is located on the eastern side of Sheffield City Centre on Pond Street. The majority of bus stands at the Interchange are inside the dedicated Interchange building, although there are five additional bus stands located at the roadside on Flat Street opposite the Interchange building. At the northern end of Flat Street is Fitzalan Square tram stop, which serves all four Sheffield Supertram routes. A short distance away via a signposted covered walkway is Sheffield station, providing train services to locations across the country. A short walk to the west of Sheffield Interchange is Arundel Gate Interchange, the city centre's second bus station, largely serving inner city routes.

Built into the Interchange is a building known as the Archway Centre, which contains a Travel South Yorkshire Customer Service Desk, WHSmith, DJ’s Cafe, Ticket Kiosks, Public Toilets and Waiting Facilities.

History

Sheffield Interchange was opened in 1936 as Pond Street bus station. Covered accommodation was built in 1956, replacing the collection of open-air bus stops. From 8 October 1960, the bus station ceased to share its accommodation with the Sheffield Tramway as the light rail network was closed. Work began on the reconstruction of the bus station in the early 1990s, and it was renamed Sheffield Interchange. A large section of the Interchange was demolished in the early 2000s, owing to under-use; this was subsequently redeveloped, and the area is now home to the Digital Campus.

Present
As well as containing 33 bus stands, Sheffield Interchange also has an information desk, public toilets and a WHSmith store within the Archway Centre, the main building. There is also a coach passenger waiting area and a cafe next to the coach stands. The Interchange is integrated with the city's railway station by way of a signposted covered walkway between the two; it is a short walk from the city centre and the nearest Supertram stop (Fitzalan Square/Ponds Forge).

Services
, the stand allocation is:

Coach services
Sheffield Interchange also has several dedicated coach stands (E1 to E6) which are used by services beginning and terminating at the interchange, as well as several others which are passing through. Stand E1 is the primary pick up/drop off point and this is where the National Express office is located. Sheffield Interchange is also served by a limited number of Stagecoach Express coach routes, as well as other lesser known coach operators. National Express, the primary user, uses the interchange for the following routes:

Bibliography
 Sheffield, Emerging City, 1969, Sheffield City Council. 
 Great Cities: Sheffield, 2005, Melwyn Jones.

References

External links
 Sheffield Interchange (South Yorkshire Passenger Transport Executive)

Bus transport in Sheffield
Sheffield
Buildings and structures in Sheffield
Sheffield City Centre